Scouting in Yukon dates back to 1913, serving thousands of young men and women.

Scouting in Yukon

Yukon is administratively connected to British Columbia in the BC/Yukon Council of Scouts Canada.

Among Yukon's varied Scouting groups are Scouts and Venturers.

Girl Guiding in Yukon

Girls from age 5 through 17 are served by the Yukon District of Girl Guides of Canada-Guides du Canada. Yukon District is part of the Aurora Adventures Area Council and Alberta Council. Through financial support from YRAC, Yukon District can provide administrative support to Guiders and girls through the Guide Office (102-302 Steele Street, Whitehorse, Y1A 2C5, 667-2455).

See also

References

External links
Yukon Scouting
British Columbia and Yukon Scouting Online
Yukon Guiding
Girl Guides of Canada - National website

Scouting and Guiding in Canada